George Blacker may refer to: 
 George Blacker (antiquary) (1791–1871), Irish clergyman and antiquary
 Sir George Blacker (obstetrician) (1865–1948), British–Irish obstetrician

See also
 George Black (disambiguation)
 Blacker (disambiguation)
 George Blackerby (1903–1987), American professional baseball player